Wilson's disease is a genetic disorder in which excess copper builds up in the body. Symptoms are typically related to the brain and liver. Liver-related symptoms include vomiting, weakness, fluid build up in the abdomen, swelling of the legs, yellowish skin and itchiness. Brain-related symptoms include tremors, muscle stiffness, trouble in speaking, personality changes, anxiety, and psychosis.

Wilson's disease is caused by a mutation in the Wilson disease protein (ATP7B) gene. This protein transports excess copper into bile, where it is excreted in waste products. The condition is autosomal recessive; for a person to be affected, they must inherit a mutated copy of the gene from both parents. Diagnosis may be difficult and often involves a combination of blood tests, urine tests and a liver biopsy. Genetic testing may be used to screen family members of those affected.

Wilson's disease is typically treated with dietary changes and medication. Dietary changes involve eating a low-copper diet and not using copper cookware. Medications used include chelating agents such as trientine and d-penicillamine and zinc supplements. Complications of Wilson's disease can include liver failure, liver cancer and kidney problems. A liver transplant may be helpful to those for whom other treatments are not effective or if liver failure occurs.

Wilson's disease occurs in about 1 in 30,000 people. Symptoms usually begin between the ages of 5 and 35 years. It was first described in 1854 by a German pathologist Friedrich Theodor von Frerichs and is named after British neurologist Samuel Wilson.

Signs and symptoms
The main sites of copper accumulation are the liver and the brain, and consequently liver disease and neuropsychiatric symptoms are the main features that lead to diagnosis. People with liver problems tend to come for medical attention earlier, generally as children or teenagers, than those with neurological and psychiatric symptoms, who tend to be in their twenties or older. Some are identified only because relatives have been diagnosed with Wilson's disease; many of these, when tested, turn out to have been experiencing symptoms of the condition but have not received a diagnosis.

Liver disease
Liver disease may present itself as tiredness, jaundice, increased bleeding tendency or confusion (due to hepatic encephalopathy) and portal hypertension. The latter, a condition in which the pressure in the portal vein is markedly increased, leads to esophageal varices, blood vessels in the esophagus that may bleed in a life-threatening fashion, as well as enlargement of the spleen (splenomegaly) and accumulation of fluid in the abdominal cavity (ascites). On examination, signs of chronic liver disease such as spider angiomata (small distended blood vessels, usually on the chest) may be observed. Chronic active hepatitis has caused cirrhosis of the liver in most by the time they develop symptoms. While most people with cirrhosis have an increased risk of hepatocellular carcinoma (liver cancer), this risk is relatively very low in Wilson's disease.

About 5% of all people are diagnosed only when they develop fulminant acute liver failure, often in the context of a hemolytic anemia (anemia due to the destruction of red blood cells). This leads to abnormalities in protein production (identified by deranged coagulation) and metabolism by the liver. The deranged protein metabolism leads to the accumulation of waste products such as ammonia in the bloodstream. When these irritate the brain, the person develops hepatic encephalopathy (confusion, coma, seizures and finally life-threatening swelling of the brain).

Neuropsychiatric symptoms
About half of the people with Wilson's disease have neurological or psychiatric symptoms. Most initially have mild cognitive deterioration and clumsiness, as well as changes in behavior. Specific neurological symptoms usually then follow, often in the form of parkinsonism (cogwheel rigidity, bradykinesia or slowed movements and a lack of balance are the most common parkinsonian features) with or without a typical hand tremor, masked facial expressions, slurred speech, ataxia (lack of coordination) or dystonia (twisting and repetitive movements of part of the body). Seizures and migraine appear to be more common in Wilson's disease. A characteristic tremor described as "wing-beating tremor" is encountered in many people with Wilson's; this is absent at rest but can be provoked by abducting the arms and flexing the elbows toward the midline.

Cognition can also be affected in Wilson's disease. This comes in two, not mutually exclusive, categories: frontal lobe disorder (may present as impulsivity, impaired judgement, promiscuity, apathy and executive dysfunction with poor planning and decision making) and subcortical dementia (may present as slow thinking, memory loss and executive dysfunction, without signs of aphasia, apraxia or agnosia). It is suggested that these cognitive involvements are related and closely linked to psychiatric manifestations of the disease.

Psychiatric problems due to Wilson's disease may include behavioral changes, depression, anxiety disorders, and psychosis. Psychiatric symptoms are commonly seen in conjunction with neurological symptoms and are rarely manifested on their own. These symptoms are often poorly defined and can sometimes be attributed to other causes. Because of this, diagnosis of Wilson's disease is rarely made when only psychiatric symptoms are present.

Other organ systems 
Medical conditions have been linked with copper accumulation in Wilson's disease:
 Eyes: Kayser–Fleischer rings (KF rings) may be visible in the cornea of the eyes, either directly or on slit lamp examination as deposits of copper form a ring around the cornea. This is due to copper deposition in Descemet's membrane. These rings can be either dark brown, golden, or reddish-green, are 1 to 3 mm wide, and appear at the corneal limbus. They do not occur in all people with Wilson's disease and may be seen in people with chronic cholestasis.  Wilson's disease is also associated with sunflower cataracts exhibited by brown or green pigmentation of the anterior and posterior lens capsule. Neither causes significant visual loss. KF rings occur in approximately 66% of diagnosed cases (more often in those with neurological symptoms rather than with liver problems).
 Kidneys: renal tubular acidosis (Type 2), a disorder of bicarbonate handling by the proximal tubules leads to nephrocalcinosis (calcium accumulation in the kidneys), a weakening of bones (due to calcium and phosphate loss), and occasionally aminoaciduria (loss of essential amino acids needed for protein synthesis).
 Heart: cardiomyopathy (weakness of the heart muscle) is a rare but recognized problem in Wilson's disease; it may lead to heart failure (fluid accumulation due to decreased pump function) and cardiac arrhythmias (episodes of irregular and/or abnormally fast or slow heart beat).
 Hormones: hypoparathyroidism (failure of the parathyroid glands leading to low calcium levels), infertility, and recurrent miscarriage.

Genetics

The Wilson's disease gene (ATP7B) is on chromosome 13 (13q14.3) and is expressed primarily in the liver, kidney, and placenta. The gene codes for a P-type (cation transport enzyme) ATPase that transports copper into bile and incorporates it into ceruloplasmin. Mutations can be detected in 90% of cases. Most (60%) are homozygous for ATP7B mutations (two abnormal copies), and 30% have only one abnormal copy. Ten percent have no detectable mutation.

Although 300 mutations of ATP7B have been described, in most populations the cases of Wilson's disease are due to a small number of mutations specific for that population. For instance, in Western populations the H1069Q mutation (replacement of a histidine by a glutamine at position 1069 in the protein) is present in 37–63% of cases, while in China this mutation is very uncommon and R778L (arginine to leucine at 778) is found more often. Relatively little is known about the relative impact of various mutations, although the H1069Q mutation seems to predict later onset and predominantly neurological problems, according to some studies. A comprehensive clinically annotated resource, WilsonGen provides a clinical classification for the variants as per the recent ACMG & AMP guidelines

A normal variation in the PRNP gene can modify the course of the disease by delaying the age of onset and affecting the type of symptoms that develop. This gene produces prion protein, which is active in the brain and other tissues and also appears to be involved in transporting copper. A role for the ApoE gene was initially suspected but could not be confirmed.

The condition is inherited in an autosomal recessive pattern. In order to inherit it, both of the parents of an individual must carry an affected gene. Most have no family history of the condition. People with only one abnormal gene are called carriers (heterozygotes) and may have mild, but medically insignificant, abnormalities of copper metabolism.

Wilson's disease is the most common from a group of hereditary diseases that cause copper overload in the liver. All can cause cirrhosis at a young age. The other members of the group are Indian childhood cirrhosis (ICC), endemic Tyrolean infantile cirrhosis and idiopathic copper toxicosis. These are not related to ATP7B mutations: for example, ICC has been linked to mutations in the KRT8 and the KRT18 gene.

Pathophysiology

Copper is needed by the body for a number of functions, predominantly as a cofactor for a number of enzymes such as ceruloplasmin, cytochrome c oxidase, dopamine β-hydroxylase, superoxide dismutase and tyrosinase.

Copper enters the body through the digestive tract. A transporter protein on the cells of the small bowel, copper membrane transporter 1 (Ctr1; SLC31A1), carries copper inside the cells, where some is bound to metallothionein and part is carried by ATOX1 to an organelle known as the trans-Golgi network. Here, in response to rising concentrations of copper, an enzyme called ATP7A (Menkes' protein) releases copper into the portal vein to the liver. Liver cells also carry the CMT1 protein, and metallothionein and ATOX1 bind it inside the cell, but here it is ATP7B that links copper to ceruloplasmin and releases it into the bloodstream, as well as removing excess copper by secreting it into bile. Both functions of ATP7B are impaired in Wilson's disease. Copper accumulates in the liver tissue; ceruloplasmin is still secreted, but in a form that lacks copper (termed apo-ceruloplasmin) and is rapidly degraded in the bloodstream.

When the amount of copper in the liver overwhelms the proteins that normally bind it, it causes oxidative damage through a process known as Fenton chemistry; this damage eventually leads to chronic active hepatitis, fibrosis (deposition of connective tissue) and cirrhosis. The liver also releases copper into the bloodstream that is not bound to ceruloplasmin. This free copper precipitates throughout the body but particularly in the kidneys, eyes and brain. In the brain, most copper is deposited in the basal ganglia, particularly in the putamen and globus pallidus (together called the lenticular nucleus); these areas normally participate in the coordination of movement as well as playing a significant role in neurocognitive processes such as the processing of stimuli and mood regulation. Damage to these areas, again by Fenton chemistry, produces the neuropsychiatric symptoms seen in Wilson's disease.

It is not clear why Wilson's disease causes hemolysis, but various lines of evidence suggest that a high level of free (non-ceruloplasmin bound) copper has a direct effect on either oxidation of hemoglobin, inhibition of energy-supplying enzymes in the red blood cell, or direct damage to the cell membrane.

Diagnosis

Wilson's disease may be suspected on the basis of any of the symptoms mentioned above, or when a close relative has been found to have Wilson's. Most have slightly abnormal liver function tests such as a raised aspartate transaminase, alanine transaminase and bilirubin level. If the liver damage is significant, albumin may be decreased due to an inability of damaged liver cells to produce this protein; likewise, the prothrombin time (a test of coagulation) may be prolonged as the liver is unable to produce proteins known as clotting factors. Alkaline phosphatase levels are relatively low in those with Wilson's-related acute liver failure. If there are neurological symptoms, magnetic resonance imaging (MRI) of the brain is usually performed; this shows hyperintensities in the part of the brain called the basal ganglia in the T2 setting. MRI may also demonstrate the characteristic "face of the giant panda" pattern.

There is no totally reliable test for Wilson's disease, but levels of ceruloplasmin and copper in the blood, as well of the amount of copper excreted in urine during a 24-hour period, are together used to form an impression of the amount of copper in the body. The gold standard—or most ideal test—is a liver biopsy.

Ceruloplasmin

Levels of ceruloplasmin are abnormally low (<0.2 g/L) in 80–95% of cases.  It can, however, be present at normal levels in people with ongoing inflammation as it is an acute phase protein. Low ceruloplasmin is also found in Menkes disease and aceruloplasminemia, which are related to, but much rarer than Wilson's disease.

The combination of neurological symptoms, eye signs and a low ceruloplasmin level is considered sufficient for the diagnosis of Wilson's disease. In many cases, however, further tests are needed.

Serum and urine copper
Serum copper is low, which may seem paradoxical given that Wilson's disease is a disease of copper excess. However, 95% of plasma copper is carried by ceruloplasmin which is often low in Wilson's disease. Urine copper is elevated in Wilson's disease and is collected for 24 hours in a bottle with a copper-free liner. Levels above 100 μg/24h (1.6 μmol/24h) confirm Wilson's disease, and levels above 40 μg/24h (0.6 μmol/24h) are strongly indicative. High urine copper levels are not unique to Wilson's disease; they are sometimes observed in autoimmune hepatitis and in cholestasis (any disease obstructing the flow of bile from the liver to the small bowel).

In children, the penicillamine test may be used. A 500 mg oral dose of penicillamine is administered, and urine collected for 24 hours. If this contains more than 1600 μg (25 μmol), it is a reliable indicator of Wilson's disease. This test has not been validated in adults.

Slit-lamp examination 
The eyes of the patient are examined using a slit-lamp to look for Kayser–Fleischer rings, which are strongly associated with Wilson's Disease and are caused by copper deposition on the inner cornea in Descemet's membrane.

Liver biopsy
Once other investigations have indicated Wilson's disease, the ideal test is the removal of a small amount of liver tissue through a liver biopsy. This is assessed microscopically for the degree of steatosis and cirrhosis, and histochemistry and quantification of copper are used to measure the severity of the copper accumulation. A level of 250 μg of copper per gram of dried liver tissue confirms Wilson's disease. Occasionally, lower levels of copper are found; in that case, the combination of the biopsy findings with all other tests could still lead to a formal diagnosis of Wilson's.

In the earlier stages of the disease, the biopsy typically shows steatosis (deposition of fatty material), increased glycogen in the nucleus, and areas of necrosis (cell death). In more advanced disease, the changes observed are quite similar to those seen in autoimmune hepatitis, such as infiltration by inflammatory cells, piecemeal necrosis and fibrosis (scar tissue). In advanced disease, finally, cirrhosis is the main finding. In acute liver failure, degeneration of the liver cells and collapse of the liver tissue architecture is seen, typically on a background of cirrhotic changes. Histochemical methods for detecting copper are inconsistent and unreliable, and taken alone are regarded as insufficient to establish a diagnosis.

Genetic testing
Mutation analysis of the ATP7B gene, as well as other genes linked to copper accumulation in the liver, may be performed. Once a mutation is confirmed, it is possible to screen family members for the disease as part of clinical genetics family counseling. Regional distributions of genes associated with Wilson's disease are important to follow, as this can help clinicians design appropriate screening strategies. Since mutations of the WD gene vary between populations, research and genetic testing done in countries like the USA or United Kingdom can pose problems as they tend to have more mixed populations.

Treatment

Diet
In general, a diet low in copper-containing foods is recommended with the avoidance of mushrooms, nuts, chocolate, dried fruit, liver, sesame seeds and sesame oil, and shellfish.

Medication
Medical treatments are available for Wilson's disease. Some increase the removal of copper from the body, while others prevent the absorption of copper from the diet.

Generally, penicillamine is the first treatment used. This binds copper (chelation) and leads to excretion of copper in the urine. Hence, monitoring of the amount of copper in the urine can be done to ensure a sufficiently high dose is taken. Penicillamine is not without problems: about 20% experience a side effect or complication of penicillamine treatment, such as drug-induced lupus (causing joint pains and a skin rash) or myasthenia (a nerve condition leading to muscle weakness). In those who presented with neurological symptoms, almost half experience a paradoxical worsening in their symptoms. While this phenomenon is observed in other treatments for Wilson's, it is usually taken as an indication for discontinuing penicillamine and commencing second-line treatment. Those intolerant to penicillamine may instead be commenced on trientine hydrochloride, which also has chelating properties. Some recommend trientine as first-line treatment, but experience with penicillamine is more extensive. A further agent, under clinical investigation by Wilson Therapeutics, with known activity in Wilson's disease is tetrathiomolybdate.  This is regarded as experimental, though some studies have shown a beneficial effect.

Once all results have returned to normal, zinc (usually in the form of a zinc acetate prescription called Galzin) may be used instead of chelators to maintain stable copper levels in the body. Zinc stimulates metallothionein, a protein in gut cells that binds copper and prevents their absorption and transport to the liver. Zinc therapy is continued unless symptoms recur or if the urinary excretion of copper increases.

In rare cases where none of the oral treatments are effective, especially in severe neurological disease, dimercaprol (British anti-Lewisite) is occasionally necessary. This treatment is injected intramuscularly (into a muscle) every few weeks and has unpleasant side effects such as pain.

People who are asymptomatic (for instance, those diagnosed through family screening or only as a result of abnormal test results) are generally treated, as the copper accumulation may cause long-term damage in the future. It is unclear whether these people are best treated with penicillamine or zinc acetate.

Physical and occupational therapies
Physiotherapy and occupational therapy are beneficial for patients with the neurologic form of the disease. The copper chelating treatment may take up to six months to start working, and these therapies can assist in coping with ataxia, dystonia, and tremors, as well as preventing the development of contractures that can result from dystonia.

Transplantation
Liver transplantation is an effective cure for Wilson's disease but is used only in particular scenarios because of the risks and complications associated with the procedure. It is used mainly in people with fulminant liver failure who fail to respond to medical treatment or in those with advanced chronic liver disease. Liver transplantation is avoided in severe neuropsychiatric illnesses, in which its benefit has not been demonstrated.

Prognosis
Left untreated, Wilson's disease tends to become progressively worse and is eventually fatal. Serious complications include liver cirrhosis, acute kidney failure and psychosis. With early detection and treatment, most of those affected can live relatively normal lives. Liver and neurologic damage that occurs prior to treatment may improve, but it is often permanent.

History
The disease bears the name of the British physician Samuel Alexander Kinnier Wilson (1878–1937), a neurologist who described the condition, including the pathological changes in the brain and liver, in 1912. Wilson's work had been predated by, and drew on, reports from German neurologist Karl Westphal (in 1883), who termed it "pseudo-sclerosis"; by the British neurologist William Gowers (in 1888); by the Finnish neuropathologist Ernst Alexander Homén (in 1889–1892), who noted the hereditary nature of the disease; and by Adolph Strümpell (in 1898), who noted hepatic cirrhosis. Neuropathologist John Nathaniel Cumings made the link with copper accumulation in both the liver and the brain in 1948. The occurrence of hemolysis was noted in 1967.

In 1951, Cumings, and  New Zealand neurologist Derek Denny-Brown, working in the United States, simultaneously reported the first effective treatment, using metal chelator British anti-Lewisite . This treatment had to be injected but was one of the first therapies available in the field of neurology, a field that classically was able to observe and diagnose but had few treatments to offer. The first effective oral chelation agent, penicillamine, was discovered in 1956 by British neurologist John Walshe. In 1982, Walshe also introduced trientine, and was the first to develop tetra-thiomolybdate for clinical use. Zinc acetate therapy initially made its appearance in the Netherlands, where physicians Schouwink and Hoogenraad used it in 1961 and in the 1970s, respectively, but it was further developed later by Brewer and colleagues at the University of Michigan.

The genetic basis of Wilson's disease, and its link to ATP7B mutations, was elucidated by several research groups in the 1980s and 1990s.

In other animals
Hereditary copper accumulation has been described in Bedlington Terriers, where it generally only affects the liver. It is due to mutations in the COMMD1 (or MURR1) gene. Despite this findings, COMMD1 mutations could not be detected in humans with non-Wilsonian copper accumulation states (such as Indian childhood cirrhosis) to explain their genetic origin.

See also
 Copper in health
 Menkes syndrome

References

External links

 

Neurological disorders
Hepatology
Diseases of liver
Autosomal recessive disorders
Rare diseases
Articles containing video clips
Wikipedia medicine articles ready to translate
Copper in health
Wikipedia neurology articles ready to translate